Steven Fox (born January 14, 1991) is an American professional golfer who won the 2012 U.S. Amateur.

Fox was born in Greenville, South Carolina. He attended Hendersonville High School in Hendersonville, Tennessee and the University of Tennessee at Chattanooga. Fox won the 2012 U.S. Amateur at Cherry Hills Country Club on the 37th hole after being down two with two holes to play. Fox was the 63rd player to qualify for match play. He had to survive a 17-man playoff for 14 spots in stroke play to qualify for the match play of the U.S. Amateur. With the win, Fox qualified for the 2013 Masters Tournament, 2013 U.S. Open, and 2013 Open Championship where he missed the cut at all three events.

Fox won the Tennessee State Amateur in August 2013.

Fox turned professional in September 2013. 

He played on the Web.com Tour in 2016 after earning his tour card through qualifying school and playing on that tour in 2014.  In 2016 he finished 128th in the rankings, playing 20 tournaments, and did not return in 2017.

Professional wins
2014 Tennessee Open

Results in major championships

CUT = missed the half-way cut
"T" = tied

U.S. national team appearances
Amateur
Eisenhower Trophy: 2012 (winners)

References

External links

American male golfers
Golfers from South Carolina
Golfers from Tennessee
Sportspeople from Greenville, South Carolina
People from Hendersonville, Tennessee
Sportspeople from Nashville, Tennessee
1991 births
Living people